Andreas Heinrich Thorbecke (14 March 1837 in Meiningen – 3 January 1890 in Mannheim) was a German Arabic scholar. His studies were dedicated mainly to the poetry of the Bedouin and the history of Arabic.

Biography
He studied at the universities of Munich and Leipzig, where he was a pupil of Heinrich Leberecht Fleischer. In 1873 he was appointed an associate professor at the University of Heidelberg, then relocated to Halle in 1885, where he attained a full professorship in 1887.

Works
 Antarah, ein vorislamitischer Dichter (Life of Antarah, the Pre-Islamite Poet, 1867).
 Al-Harīri's Durrat-al-gawwas (1871); edition of Al-Hariri.
 Al-A'schā's Lobgedicht auf Mahammed (Al Ashâ's Song of Praise to Mohammed, 1875)
 Ibn Duraid's Kitāb al-malāhin (1882); edition of Ibn Duraid.
 Die Mufad-dali-jāt (The Mufaddaaliyyat, 1885). 
 Mihail Sabbag's Grammatik der arabischen Umgangssprache in Syrien und Aegypten (M. Sabbâg's Grammar of Conversational Arabic in Syria and Egypt, 1886).

References

 This source gives 1887 as the date of his appointment to Halle and doesn't mention Heidelberg.

External links

1837 births
1890 deaths
German orientalists
German philologists
Ludwig Maximilian University of Munich alumni
Leipzig University alumni
Academic staff of the University of Halle
Academic staff of Heidelberg University
German male non-fiction writers